Ciaran Gourley is a Gaelic footballer for the Tyrone county team. He is a three-time All-Ireland-winner with his county. In 2008, he topped off his season by managing St Patrick's Academy, Dungannon to MacRory Cup and Hogan Cup successes.

References

Year of birth missing (living people)
Living people
Tyrone inter-county Gaelic footballers
Winners of one All-Ireland medal (Gaelic football)